The Nokia 770 Internet Tablet is a wireless Internet appliance from Nokia, originally announced at the LinuxWorld Summit in New York City on 25 May 2005. It is designed for wireless Internet browsing and email functions and includes software such as Internet radio, an RSS news reader, ebook reader, image viewer and media players for selected types of media.

The device went on sale in Europe on 3 November 2005, at a suggested retail price of €349 to €369 (£245 in the United Kingdom). In the United States, the device became available for purchase through Nokia USA's web site on 14 November 2005 for $359.99. On 8 January 2007, Nokia announced the Nokia N800, the successor to the 770. In July 2007, the price for the Nokia 770 fell to under US$150 / 150 EUR / 100 GBP.

Specifications 
 Dimensions: 141×79×19 mm (5.5×3.1×0.7 in)
 Weight: 230 g (8.1 oz) with protective cover or 185 g (6.5 oz) without.
 Processor: Texas Instruments OMAP 1710 CPU running at 252 MHz. It combines the ARM architecture of the ARM926TEJ core subsystem with a Texas Instruments TMS320C55x digital signal processor.
 Memory: 64 MB (64 × 220 bytes) of DDR RAM, and 128 MB of internal flash memory, of which about 64 MB should be available to the user. Option for extended virtual memory (RS-MMC up to 1 GB (2 GB after flash upgrade)).
 Display and resolution: 4.1 inches, 800×480 pixels at 225 pixels per inch with up to 65,536 colors
 Connectivity: WLAN (IEEE 802.11b/g), Bluetooth 1.2, dial-up access, USB (both user-mode, and non-powered host-mode)
 Expansion: RS-MMC (both RS-MMC and DV-RS-MMC cards are supported).
 Audio: speaker and a microphone

The device was manufactured in Estonia and Germany.

Maemo 

The 770, like all Nokia Internet Tablets, runs Maemo, which is similar to many handheld operating systems and provides a "Home" screen—the central point from which all applications and settings are accessed. The home screen is divided into areas for launching applications, a menu bar, and a large customisable area that can display information such as an RSS reader, Internet radio player, and Google search box, for example. Maemo is a modified version of Debian.

The 770 is bundled with applications including the Opera web browser, Macromedia Flash and Gizmo.

A critical bug has been identified that causes memory corruption when using the WLAN connection. This could result in system instability and data corruption. Owners of the 770 are encouraged to apply the bugfix; preferably before having used the WLAN connection for the first time.

Versatility 
Because of the Linux-based operating system and the open-source contributions from Nokia, the Nokia 770 Internet Tablet has a great appeal to the hacker and DIY markets. Programmers are porting applications to the Maemo platform, allowing a much more rapidly growing application catalog than other mobile platforms would enjoy. The inclusion of Wi-Fi, Bluetooth, and USB host functionality (through a hack) permits enthusiasts to expand their tablets to include USB mass storage, Bluetooth GPS receivers, a normal USB keyboard, or other devices.

Criticism 
The Nokia 770 has received criticism from some technology reviewers. The most common complaint was about the overall speed of the system, due to the relatively slow CPU and the size of the on-board memory (64 MiB). Short battery life (less than 4 hours in the case of continuous Wi-Fi usage) was also a concern. Some reviews suggested problems with the handwriting recognition, and some said tapping the on-screen keyboard was too slow.

Another common complaint was that it lacked the functions of a mobile PDA, although there are now several PIM options created by the community. Also, for Internet access away from Wi-Fi hotspots, the Nokia 770 relies upon a Bluetooth 1.2 phone acting as a modem, and not all bluetooth phones will work with the tablet. Additionally, some complained that the device used Reduced-Size MMC (RS-MMC or Micro-MMC) cards that were originally difficult to find. However, the format has since been used in other products and has become widely available. The device originally could only use cards up to 1 GB, but 2 GB cards are supported with the current version of the operating system.

See also 
 Nokia N800, the successor to the Nokia 770
 Nokia N810
 Nokia N900
 Nokia N950
 Nokia N9

References

External links 
 Applications for the Nokia 770.
 Ari Jaaksi's Blog - Former director of the open source software operations of Nokia.
 - Tutorials for new 770, N800, N810 users

Internet Tablet
Mobile computers
Linux-based devices
Computer-related introductions in 2005
Embedded Linux